Mangelia ecuadoriana is an extinct species of sea snail, a marine gastropod mollusk in the family Mangeliidae.

Description
The length of the shell attains 3 mm, its diameter 1.8 mm.

Distribution
This extinct marine species was found in Pliocene-Pleistocene strata of Ecuador; age range: 5.332 to 2.588 Ma

References

External links
 Worldwide Mollusc Species Data Base: Mangelia ecuadoriana
 Fossilworks : Mangelia ecuadoriana

ecuadoriana
Gastropods described in 1941